Ribnica is a small settlement on the right bank of the Reka River in the Municipality of Pivka in the Inner Carniola region of Slovenia.

Name
The name Ribnica was originally a hydronym derived from the common noun riba 'fish', thus referring to a stream with many fish and, by extension, a settlement along such a stream.

History
Ribnica was formerly a hamlet of Mala Pristava. In 1994, territory from Nadanje Selo, Mala Pristava, Nova Sušica, and Stara Sušica was combined to create Ribnica as a separate settlement.

Mass graves

Ribnica is the site of two mass graves from the end of World War II. They both contain the remains of German soldiers that fell in May 1945. The Loka Mass Grave contained the bodies of 31 soldiers killed on May 4, 1945, which were exhumed between September 6 and 13, 2017.

Cultural heritage

Several sites in Ribnica have been registered as cultural heritage.
The Mršnik Farm is located at house no. 7 at the main intersection in Ribnica. It consists of a farmhouse and barn, and an inn and store formerly operated at the property. The carved stone doorframe of the house bears the year 1870.
The Stružnik Farm is located at Ribnica no. 18 (formerly Nadanje Selo 45), southeast of the main settlement. The house dates from 1711, and the property also has a grain maill dating from 1718 and a sawmill daring from 1725. It stands on the right bank of the Reka River.
The Lunj Farm is located at Ribnica no. 20 (formerly Nadanje Selo 53), southeast of the main settlement. The house dates to the early 17th century, and the property also has a simple sawmill and grain mill. It stands on the right bank of the Reka River.

References

External links

Ribnica on Geopedia

Populated places in the Municipality of Pivka